Lebiini is a tribe of ground beetles in the family Carabidae. There are more than 250 genera and 4,800 described species in Lebiini.

Genera
These 251 genera belong to the tribe Lebiini:

Subtribe Agrina Kirby, 1837
 Abaditicus Ball & Hilchie, 1983
 Abrodiella Bousquet, 2002
 Agra Fabricius, 1801
 Allardina Basilewsky, 1963
 Amelus Chaudoir, 1873
 Anomotariella Baehr, 2012
 Anomotarus Chaudoir, 1875
 Apterodromites Mateu, 1976
 Aspasiola Chaudoir, 1877
 Calleida Latreille, 1824
 Calleidomorpha Motschulsky, 1855
 Callidadelpha Steinheil, 1875
 Chaudoirina Mateu, 1955
 Cryptobatis Eschscholtz, 1829
 Cyanotarus Reed, 1874
 Cylindronotum Putzeys, 1845
 Demetrida White, 1846
 Diabaticus Bates, 1878
 Do Baehr, 2009
 Dromidea Perroud & Montrouzier, 1864
 Epikastea Liebke, 1935
 Eujalmenus Bousquet, 2002
 Euplatia Chaudoir, 1873
 Eurycalleida Maindron, 1905
 Falsodromius Mateu, 1976
 Glycia Chaudoir, 1842
 Hyboptera Chaudoir, 1873
 Hybopteroides Erwin & Ball, 2012
 Infernophilus Larson, 1969
 Kteatus Liebke, 1936
 Lipostratia Chaudoir, 1873
 Merizomena Chaudoir, 1873
 Mimodromius Chaudoir, 1873
 Mimophilorhizus Mateu, 1993
 Oechalius Liebke, 1935
 Ogygium Liebke, 1935
 Onota Chaudoir, 1873
 Otoglossa Chaudoir, 1873
 Paraglycia Bedel, 1904
 Phacocerus Chaudoir, 1873
 Philophuga Motschulsky, 1859
 Phloeocarabus W.J.MacLeay, 1871
 Plochionus Dejean, 1821
 Pontonoa Liebke, 1935
 Pseudotoglossa Mateu, 1961
 Pylartesius Liebke, 1939
 Rugitarus Baehr, 2009
 Speotarus B.Moore, 1964
 Straneotia Mateu, 1961
 Tecnophilus Chaudoir, 1877
 Teiresia Liebke, 1935
 Thoasia Liebke, 1939
 Titaresius Liebke, 1935
 Trigonothops W.J.MacLeay, 1864
 Valeriaaschero Erwin, 2004
 Vianasia Mateu, 1955
Subtribe Apenina Ball
 Apenes LeConte, 1851
 Cymindoidea Laporte, 1833
 Habutarus Ball & Hilchie, 1983
 Platytarus Fairmaire, 1850
 Trymosternus Chaudoir, 1873
Subtribe Celaenephina Habu, 1982
 Celaenephes Schmidt-Goebel, 1846
Subtribe Cymindidina Laporte, 1834
 Afrotarus Jeannel, 1949
 Assadecma Basilewsky, 1982
 Cymindis Latreille, 1805
 Hystrichopus Boheman, 1848
 Leptosarcus Péringuey, 1896
 Metaxymorphus Chaudoir, 1850
 Petrimagnia Kryzhanovskij & Mikhailov, 1971
 Pinacodera Schaum, 1857
 Plagiopyga Boheman, 1848
 Pseudomasoreus Desbrochers des Loges, 1904
 Taridius Chaudoir, 1875
Subtribe Demetriadina Bates, 1886
 Cylindrocranius Chaudoir, 1878
 Demetrias Bonelli, 1810
Subtribe Dromiusina Bonelli, 1810
 Afrodromius Basilewsky, 1958
 Axinopalpus LeConte, 1846
 Barrymooreana Baehr, 1997
 Brachynopterus Bedel, 1898
 Brigalowia Baehr, 2006
 Calodromius Reitter, 1905
 Carbonellia Mateu, 1968
 Disciferella Kataev & Muilwijk, 2020
 Dromiops Péringuey, 1898
 Dromius Bonelli, 1810
 Dromoceryx Schmidt-Goebel, 1846
 Geoffreyella Baehr, 2012
 Klepteromimus Péringuey, 1898
 Mesolestes Schatzmayr, 1943
 Metadromius Bedel, 1907
 Microdaccus Schaum in Baudi di Selve, 1864
 Microlestes Schmidt-Goebel, 1846
 Microlestodes Baehr, 1987
 Monnea Mateu, 1970
 Negrea Mateu, 1968
 Omophagus Andrewes, 1937
 Oxoides Solier, 1849
 Paradromius Fowler, 1887
 Philorhizus Hope, 1838
 Polyaulacus Chaudoir, 1878
 Psammodromius Peyerimhoff, 1927
 Pseudomonnea Mateu, 1983
 Somalodromius Mateu, 1967
 Xenodromius Bates, 1891
 Zolotarevskyella Mateu, 1953
Subtribe Gallerucidiina Chaudoir, 1872
 Gallerucidia Chaudoir, 1872
 Lebidia A.Morawitz, 1862
Subtribe Lebiina Bonelli, 1810
 Alkestis Liebke, 1939
 Aristolebia Bates, 1892
 Daer Semenov & Znojko, 1929
 Lachnolebia Maindron, 1905
 Lebia Latreille, 1802
 Lebidema Motschulsky, 1864
 Lebiomorphica Lorenz, 1998
 Lebistina Motschulsky, 1864
 Lebistinida Péringuey, 1898
 Lionedya Chaudoir, 1871
 Matabele Péringuey, 1896
 Megalebia Mateu, 1972
 Orthobasis Chaudoir, 1871
 Pachylebia Jeannel, 1949
 Pachylebiodes Mateu, 1972
 Paulianolebia Mateu, 1972
 Pseudopachylebia Mateu, 1972
 Rhopalostyla Chaudoir, 1850
 Scalidion Schmidt-Goebel, 1846
 Setolebia Jedlicka, 1941
 Sofota Jedlicka, 1951
Subtribe Lichnasthenina J.Thomson
 Astastus Péringuey, 1896
 Australovelinda Baehr, 2012
 Imasakaia Arai & Morita, 2010
 Lichnasthenus J.Thomson, 1858
 Mimovelindopsis Mateu, 1963
 Velinda Andrewes, 1921
 Velindastus Schüle & Lorenz, 2008
 Velindomimus Jeannel, 1955
 Velindopsis Burgeon, 1937
Subtribe Lionychina Jeannel, 1948
 Apristomimus Mateu, 1969
 Apristus Chaudoir, 1846
 Eremolestes Maindron, 1905
 Lionychus Wissmann, 1846
 Lorestania Anichtchenko, 2011
 Metablus Jedlicka, 1958
 Omobrus Andrewes, 1930
 Singiliomimus Péringuey, 1896
 Syntomus Hope, 1838
 Tilius Chaudoir, 1876
 Trichidema Basilewsky, 1956
Subtribe Metallicina Basilewsky, 1984
 Euproctinus Leng & Mutchler, 1927
 Metallica Chaudoir, 1873
 Pachycallida Jeannel, 1949
 Parena Motschulsky, 1860
Subtribe Peliocypadina Basilewsky, 1984
 Demetriola Jeannel, 1949
 Peliocypas Schmidt-Goebel, 1846
Subtribe Pericalina Hope, 1838
 Agonocheila Chaudoir, 1848
 Allophanes Andrewes, 1939
 Allophanopsis Louwerens, 1952
 Amphimenes Bates, 1873
 Amphimenoides Kirschenhofer, 1999
 Antimerina Alluaud, 1897
 Arsinoe Laporte, 1834
 Auchmerus Andrewes, 1929
 Bellavalentis Hunting & Yang, 2019
 Brachichila Chaudoir, 1870
 Brachyctis Chaudoir, 1870
 Catascopellus Straneo, 1969
 Catascopus Kirby, 1825
 Cheilagona Baehr, 2006
 Coptodera Dejean, 1825
 Coptoglossus Chaudoir, 1870
 Coptoptera Chaudoir, 1837
 Coptopterella Basilewsky, 1961
 Coptopterina Basilewsky, 1956
 Crassagena Baehr, 2006
 Cylindropectus Lorenz, 1998
 Dolichoctis Schmidt-Goebel, 1846
 Dontolobus Basilewsky, 1970
 Drymatus Motschulsky, 1862
 Eucheila Dejean, 1829
 Eurycoleus Chaudoir, 1848
 Eurydera Laporte, 1831
 Formosiella Jedlicka, 1951
 Gidda Andrewes, 1920
 Glyphodactyla Chaudoir, 1837
 Holcoderus Chaudoir, 1870
 Horniulus Jedlicka, 1932
 Labocephalus Chaudoir, 1848
 Lelis Chaudoir, 1870
 Lioptera Chaudoir, 1870
 Lobodontidius Basilewsky, 1970
 Lobodontulus Basilewsky, 1970
 Lobodontus Chaudoir, 1842
 Madecassina Jeannel, 1949
 Mascarenhia Alluaud, 1933
 Menarus Andrewes, 1939
 Metascopus Basilewsky, 1970
 Minuphloeus Darlington, 1968
 Minuthodes Andrewes, 1941
 Miscelus Klug, 1834
 Mochtherus Schmidt-Goebel, 1846
 Mormolyce Hagenbach, 1825
 Mormolycina Jeannel, 1949
 Neocoptodera Jeannel, 1949
 Nycteis Laporte, 1835
 Oreodicastes Maindron, 1905
 Oxyodontus Chaudoir, 1870
 Paradolichoctis Baehr, 2006
 Pareurydera Jeannel, 1949
 Pectinitarsus Fairmaire, 1881
 Pericalus W.S.MacLeay, 1825
 Philophlaeus Chaudoir, 1844
 Phloeoxena Chaudoir, 1870
 Pristacrus Chaudoir, 1870
 Pseudoplatiella Baehr, 2012
 Serrimargo Chaudoir, 1870
 Sfitakantha Andrewes, 1919
 Sinurus Chaudoir, 1870
 Stenognathus Chaudoir, 1843
 Stenotelus Bouchard, 1903
 Stilboma Andrewes, 1933
 Stricklandiana Bousquet, 2002
 Tantillus Chaudoir, 1870
 Thyreochaetus Basilewsky, 1959
 Thyreopterus Dejean, 1831
 Thysanotus Chaudoir, 1848
 Trichocoptodera Louwerens, 1958
 Xanthos Kirschenhofer, 2003
 Xenitenopsis Basilewsky, 1956
 Xenitenus Péringuey, 1896
Subtribe Physoderina Chaudoir, 1877
 Allocota Motschulsky, 1860
 Anchista Nietner, 1856
 Dasiosoma Britton, 1937
 Diamella Shi & Liang, 2013
 Endynomena Chaudoir, 1873
 Lachnoderma W.J.MacLeay, 1873
 Metallanchista Shi & Liang, 2013
 Orionella Jedlicka, 1964
 Paraphaea Bates, 1873
 Physodera Eschscholtz, 1829
Subtribe Pseudotrechina Basilewsky, 1984
 Pseudotrechus Rosenhauer, 1856
Subtribe Singilina Jeannel, 1949
 Singilis Rambur, 1837
Subtribe Somotrichina Mateu, 1963
 Oecornis Britton, 1940
 Paulianites Jeannel, 1949
 Pephrica Alluaud, 1936
 Somotrichus Seidlitz, 1887
Subtribe Sugimotoina Habu, 1975
 Sugimotoa Habu, 1975
Subtribe Trichina Basilewsky, 1984
 Trichis Klug, 1832
 Not assigned to a subtribe
†Cymindoides Motschulsky, 1856
†Lebina Germar, 1813
†Miolebidia Zhang; Liu & Shangguan, 1989
†Protoscalidion L.Schaufuss, 1888

References

Further reading

 

Harpalinae